The 2007–08 Michigan Wolverines men's basketball team represented the University of Michigan in intercollegiate college basketball during the 2007–08 season. The team played its home games in the Crisler Arena in Ann Arbor, Michigan, and was a member of the Big Ten Conference.  Under the direction of head coach John Beilein, the team finished tied for ninth in the Big Ten Conference.  The team earned a ninth seed and advanced to the second round of the 2008 Big Ten Conference men's basketball tournament.  The team failed to earn an invitation to either the 2008 National Invitation Tournament or the 2008 NCAA Men's Division I Basketball Tournament. The team was unranked for all eighteen weeks of Associated Press Top Twenty-Five Poll, and ended the season unranked in the final USA Today/CNN Poll. Ron Coleman served as team captain, and Manny Harris earned team MVP honors.

The team set the Big Ten conference, single-season record for three-point field goals attempted in conference games with 434.  The team would rebreak this record the following season.

Ekpe Udoh led the Big Ten in blocked shots with a 2.67 conference game average and a 2.88 all game average.  Overall, Michigan led the Big Ten with a 4.28 blocks per games in conference games.  Udoh would later transfer to Baylor University and, as a junior, lead the Big 12 Conference in blocked shots as well.

In the 2008 Big Ten Conference men's basketball tournament at the Conseco Fieldhouse from March 13–16, Michigan was seeded ninth. In the first round, they defeated number 8 Iowa 55–47 before losing to number 1 Wisconsin 51–34 in the second round.

Team Players Drafted into the NBA

*Transferred to Baylor Bears basketball before being drafted

References

External links
stats @ ESPN

Michigan Wolverines men's basketball seasons
Michigan Wolverines
Michigan
Michigan